The São Paulo Museum of Image and Sound (in Portuguese, Museu da Imagem e do Som de São Paulo, or MIS) is a public museum of audio-visual works, established in 1970 and located in São Paulo, Brazil. The museum was founded as a result of a project conducted in the 1960s  by Brazilian intellectuals, such as Ricardo Cravo Albin, Paulo Emílio Salles Gomes and Rudá de Andrade, with the purpose of endowing the country with institutions devoted to studying and documenting works of the new media that had been ignored by traditional museums.

The museum is housed in a 5,000 square meters building in Pinheiros district, inaugurated in 1975. During the 1970s and 1980s, the museum had an active role as a center of artistic diffusion and education-related activities, becoming an important reference for studies on the Brazilian audio-visual production.

The museum's collection includes more than 350,000 entries. It comprises films (shorts, features, and documentaries), videos, records, photographs, works of graphic design, etc. The museum keeps an important program of transcription and documentation of oral tradition and the LabMIS, a research and production center for new media with an artist-in-residence program.

See also 
 List of music museums
 São Paulo Museum of Art
 Museum of Contemporary Art, University of São Paulo
 Museum of the Portuguese Language
 Rio de Janeiro Museum of Image and Sound
 Ema Gordon Klabin Cultural Foundation

References

External links

Official site 

Image And Sound
Museums established in 1970
Media museums
Art museums and galleries in Brazil
Museum Of Image And Sound